The Russian Academy of Natural Sciences (Russian: Российская академия естественных наук) is a Russian non-governmental organization founded on August 31 1990 in Moscow in the former Soviet Union, following a decree by the Supreme Soviet of Russia. , the Academy operates under the Federal Law of August 23, 1996 No. 127-FZ "On Science and State Scientific-Technical Politics". The academy states that it seeks to unite scholars in different fields for the betterment of Russia.

As of 2020, its president is Oleg Leonidovich Kuznetsov and its Vice President and Chief Secretary is Lida Vladimirovna Ivanitskaya.

The academy is not associated with the Russian Academy of Sciences. It has been criticised because many members lack scientific credentials and some espouse pseudoscientific theories such as Aušra Augustinavičiūtė's socionics and Anatoly Fomenko's "New Chronology".
Currently, the Russian Academy of Natural Sciences includes 24 central sections, more than 100 regional and thematic departments, research centers, united in eight blocks working in the relevant areas.

See also 
 Natural science
 Russian Academy of Sciences

References 

 
Science and technology in Russia
1990 establishments in Russia
Scientific organizations established in 1990
National academies of sciences
Russian National Academies
Non-governmental academies based in Russia